Llanarthney railway station served the village of Llanarthney, in the historical county of Carmarthenshire, Wales, from 1865 to 1963 on the Llanelly Railway.

History 
The station was opened as Llanarthney on 1 June 1865 by the Llanelly Railway. It was downgraded to a request stop on 1 April 1880 due to a dispute with London North Western Railway but the normal service resumed in June of the same year. The suffix 'halt' was added to its name in 1954. The station closed on 9 September 1963. The site is now a private residence.

References 

Disused railway stations in Carmarthenshire
Railway stations in Great Britain opened in 1865
Railway stations in Great Britain closed in 1963
1865 establishments in Wales
1963 disestablishments in Wales